George Southcote MP of Calverleigh (1533–1589) was an English politician.

He was a Member (MP) of the Parliament of England for Lostwithiel in April 1554 and Tavistock in 1558, it is strongly believed that he was made member of parliament for Tavistock due to his brothers great friendship and association with the 2nd Earl of Bedford, the lord of the borough.

His daughter, Margaret Southcott, married John Davie (1541/2-1611/2) of Exeter, Crediton and Creedy. George had two grandchildren by the marriage a son and heir Sir John Davie, 1st Baronet (died 1654) and a daughter Margaret Davie, wife of Gideon Haydon of Cadhay, Epford and Woodbury.

References

1589 deaths
Members of the Parliament of England for Tavistock
Members of the Parliament of England for Lostwithiel
English MPs 1554
English MPs 1558
Year of birth uncertain
George